Antonio Riboldi, I.C.  (16 January 1923 – 10 December 2017) was an Italian Prelate of Catholic Church. Riboldi was born in Triuggio, Italy and ordained a priest on 29 June 1951 from the religious order of the Institute of Charity. Riboldi was appointed bishop of the Diocese of Acerra on 25 January 1978 and ordained on 11 March 1978. Riboldi retired from the diocese of Acerra on 7 December 1999.

External links
Catholic-Hierarchy
Acerra Diocese

1923 births
2017 deaths
People from the Province of Monza e Brianza
20th-century Italian Roman Catholic bishops